Fatted calf is a metaphor or symbol of festive celebration and rejoicing for someone's long-awaited return. It derives from the Parable of the Prodigal Son in the New Testament.  In biblical times, people would often keep at least one piece of livestock that was fed a special diet to fatten it up, thus making it more flavorsome when prepared as a meal.  Slaughtering this livestock was to be done on rare and special occasions. Thus when the prodigal son returns, the father "kills the fatted calf" to show that the celebration is out of the ordinary.

In modern usage, "killing the fatted calf" can simply mean to celebrate in an exuberant manner.

References 

 The New Dictionary of Cultural Literacy (3rd ed. 2002)

English-language idioms
Biblical phrases
Metaphors referring to food and drink
Metaphors referring to cattle
Parties
Cattle in religion
Animals in the Bible